Mumsie or Mumsée is a 1920 play by the Anglo-American writer Edward Knoblock.

Stage adaptation
It was first staged at the Little Theatre in London, lasting for a run of 38 performances from February 24th to March 27th. It marked the reopening of the Little Theatre which had been damaged in an air raid in 1917. The original cast included Henry Kendall, Edna Best, Diana Hamilton, Cyril Raymond and Eva Moore.

Film adaptation
In 1927 it was turned into a silent British film Mumsie directed by Herbert Wilcox and starring Herbert Marshall.

References

Bibliography
 Wearing, J. P. The London Stage 1920-1929: A Calendar of Productions, Performers, and Personnel. p.10 "Little". Rowman & Littlefield, 2014. 
 Goble, Alan. The Complete Index to Literary Sources in Film. p.264 "Knoblock" and p.877 "Mumsie". Walter de Gruyter, 1999. 

1920 plays
Plays by Edward Knoblock
British plays
West End plays